Mark Irwin Greene is a professor in the Department of Pathology and Laboratory Medicine at the University of Pennsylvania.

Education
Greene received his MD in 1968 from the University of Manitoba in Canada. Greene interned and did his residency at University and the Health Sciences Centre in Winnipeg and became a Fellow of the Royal College of Physicians in Canada in 1976. Greene received his Ph.D. in immunology from the University of Manitoba in 1977.
University of Manitoba, Canada, 1968
 M.D. University of Manitoba, Canada, 1972
 (Intern), Health Sciences Centre, Winnipeg, Canada, 1973
 F.R.C.P (Internal Medicine), Fellow of the Royal College of Physicians (Canada), 1976
 (Resident), Health Sciences Centre, Winnipeg, Canada, 1976
 Ph.D. (Immunology), University of Manitoba, Canada, 1977

Awards and recognition 
Greene received the J. Allyn Taylor International Prize in Medicine in 2006, the Adams County Breast Cancer Research Award in 2007, and the Cotlove Award in 2008. In 2010 he received the Guerin Chair in Cancer from Cedars Sinai. In 2011 Greene was made an honorary fellow of Lincoln College, Oxford.

Guggenheim Fellows

References

External links 
 Faculty bio page at University of Pennsylvania

Year of birth missing (living people)
Living people
American pathologists